Hereroland was the first bantustan in South West Africa (present day Namibia), intended by the apartheid government to be a self-governing homeland for the Herero people. It was set up in 1968.

Hereroland, like other homelands in South West Africa, was abolished in May 1989 at the start of the transition to independence.

See also
Apartheid
Leaders of Hereroland

References

History of Namibia
Bantustans in South West Africa
Herero people
States and territories established in 1968
States and territories disestablished in 1989
1968 establishments in South West Africa